Joanna Jackson may refer to:

 Johanna Jackson (born 1985), British race walker
 Joanna Jackson (equestrian) (born 1970), British equestrian